The 2007 European Wrestling Championships was held from 17 April to 22 April 2007 in Sofia, Bulgaria.

Medal table

Medal summary

Men's Greco-Roman

Men's Freestyle

Women's freestyle

External links 
 "European Championships – United World Wrestling

References

European Championships
2007
2007 in European sport
2007 in Bulgarian sport
European Championships,2007
April 2007 sports events in Europe
Sports competitions in Sofia
2007,Wrestling European Championships